The following is a list of all team-to-team transactions that have occurred in the National Hockey League (NHL) during the 1965–66 NHL season. It lists which team each player has been traded to and for which player(s) or other consideration(s), if applicable.

Transactions 

Notes
 Chicago Black Hawks allow the New York Rangers to assign Larry Mickey to the CHL without offering him tp the Black Hawks first.
 Trade completed on June 6, 1966.

References

Transactions
National Hockey League transactions